Lahathua is a village of Tahshil Barachatti. Barachatti is a block (Tehsil) in the Gaya district of Bihar, India. The Middle school of Lahathua is Primary Education Center.

Notify people- Subodh .

Villages in Gaya district